Chaz Hall, better known by his stage name Elucid (often stylized as E L U C I D), is an American rapper and record producer from New York City. He has been a member of Armand Hammer, Cult Favorite, Lessondary, Nostrum Grocers, and Small Bills.

Early life
Elucid was born Chaz Hall in Jamaica, Queens. His mother was a singer and his father was a bassist. He grew up in Deer Park, New York. Subsequently, he moved to East New York, Brooklyn.

Career
Elucid released his debut solo studio album, Save Yourself, in 2016. In 2017, he released a mixtape, Valley of Grace. In 2018, he released a collaborative studio album with Milo, titled Nostrum Grocers, under the group moniker Nostrum Grocers. In that year, he also released a mixtape, Shit Don't Rhyme No More. In 2019, he released a mixtape, Every Egg I Cracked Today Was Double Yolked. He released "Seership!" in 2020. In that year, he also released a collaborative studio album with The Lasso, titled Don't Play It Straight, under the group moniker Small Bills. In 2022, he released a solo studio album, I Told Bessie.

Discography

Studio albums
 Save Yourself (2016)
 Nostrum Grocers (2018) 
 Don't Play It Straight (2020) 
 I Told Bessie (2022)

Mixtapes
 Smash & Grab (2007)
 Police & Thieves (2008)
 The Sub Bass Diet (2009)
 Super Chocolate Black Simian (2011)
 Super Chocolate Black Simian II (2011)
 Bird Eat Snake // The Love Offering (2012)
 Valley of Grace (2017)
 Horse Latitude (2017)
 No Edge Ups in Uganda (2018) 
 Shit Don't Rhyme No More (2018)
 Every Egg I Cracked Today Was Double Yolked (2019)

Extended plays
 Bear Trapz (2009)
 Osage (2016)

Singles
 "Bernadette" (2017)
 "Seership!" (2020)

References

External links
 Official website
 

Year of birth missing (living people)
Living people
Rappers from New York City
Record producers from New York (state)
American male rappers
21st-century American rappers
21st-century American male musicians